Robert Snooks was the last man to be executed in England for highway robbery, on 11 March 1802. Born in Hungerford in Berkshire, he was christened as James Snook on 16 August 1761. The fact that his name is commonly quoted as Robert Snooks is perhaps due to a corruption of his identity as the "Robber" Snook.

The crime 
On the evening of Sunday 10 May 1801 post boy John Stevens, travelling from Tring to Hemel Hempstead, was entrusted with several mail bags of  post. Upon reaching an isolated part of Boxmoor, near Bourne End, he was threatened by a highwayman who stole from him six leather bags containing bank notes, promissory notes and letters. The highwayman took the money, of a value of £80, and discarded the unwanted letters and bags, leaving them strewn across the moor. It was revealed in the London Chronicle of 11 March 1802, that the highwayman had also discarded his saddle with a broken girth strap on the moor, a mistake that would subsequently lead to the identification of the culprit.

Investigation and trial 
The day after the theft, Postmaster and High Constable John Page (of the Kings Arms in nearby Berkhamsted) initiated investigations into the crime, it was then that several people came forward and stated they remembered seeing a man at the Kings Arms fixing a broken girth-strap on his saddle. It was believed that the culprit worked at the Kings Arms as an ostler, and would thus have some knowledge of the post boy's route. The culprit was identified as James Snook.

By this time James Snook was already a wanted man, in connection with several highway robberies between Bath and Salisbury. He had also been indicted for horse-stealing at the Old Bailey in 1799, under what is assumed to be his full name of James Blackman Snooks. For this charge he was acquitted, due to lack of firm evidence.

A reward of £200 was offered by the  Postmaster General in addition to the £100 offered by Parliament for the apprehending of highwaymen. He was subsequently captured in Marlborough Forest on 8 December 1801, by William Salt, a post-boy who was driving a chaise through the forest. Salt recognised Snook, and managed to apprehend the thief with the help of his passengers. At this point, Snook had £200 in his pocket, as well as 'a brace of very handsome pistols'. John Stevens, was unable to positively identify Snook, as it was dark at the time of the robbery, as a result, there was only circumstantial evidence that linked Snook to the crime. This included one of the stolen bank notes being traced back to being in Snook's possession, when he accidentally gave it to a serving girl in Southwark whilst trying to purchase some cloth.

He was initially held in Newgate Prison, before being moved to Hertford Gaol on 4 March 1802 whilst awaiting trial. Five days later, the trial took place and he was found guilty. Whilst the typical punishment for highway robbery was transportation, due to Snook's crime being "of a nature so destructive to society and the commercial interests to the country", he was sentenced to be hanged.

Punishment 
Snook's punishment took place two days after his sentencing, on public ground nearest to the scene of the crime, as the law required. It is believed that thousands of people flocked to see the hanging, and it was to some of this number that Snook's is reputed to have exclaimed "It's no good hurrying - they can't start the fun until I get there!" whilst on his way to the gallows. Snook's body was dug up the day after his hanging, was interred in a coffin provided by the residents of Hemel Hempstead and unceremoniously re-interred on the moor.

A small headstone (bearing the name 'Robert Snooks') was erected by the Box Moor Trust in 1904, whilst a footstone was installed in 1994, as part of the Trust's 400 year anniversary. The exact location of Snook's hanging, and subsequent burial is unknown, so the location of the stones is an approximation.

Legacy 
A pub in the nearby Pavilion in Hemel Hempstead, since demolished, was named after Snooks and used the silhouette of a mounted highwayman as its sign. One of the local Explorer Scout units is also named after him. In addition to the gravestones, the Box Moor Trust has also named one of the moors 'Snook's Moor', whilst the Estate Managers house is appropriately named 'Snook's End'. .

References

External links
Snook's Grave, Boxmoor Common, Hertfordshire

1802 deaths
1761 births
English highwaymen
People from Hungerford
Executed people from Berkshire
People executed for robbery
19th-century executions by England and Wales
Hemel Hempstead
1802 crimes in the United Kingdom
Burials in Hertfordshire